Vic is a 2006 American short film drama. It is the directorial debut of Sage Stallone. The film stars Clu Gulager, Tom Gulager and Miriam Byrd-Nethery with cameos by Carol Lynley,  John LaZar, and John Phillip Law. Stallone won the 2006 Boston Film Festival “Best New Filmmaker” award for the film. The film had its world premiere at the 2006 Palm Springs International Festival of Short Films, where the cast and filmmakers were in attendance.

Premise
Clu Gulager plays a "down-on-his-luck" actor who gets a mysterious phone call. Haunted by memories of his former glory days, Vic struggles for a  Hollywood comeback.

Cast
 Clu Gulager  –  Vic Reeves
 Miriam Byrd-Nethery  –  Mary Kay
 Carol Lynley  –  Carrie Lee
 Gregory Sierra –  Charlie
 John Phillip Law –  John Shelbourne
 John LaZar – Ron Barzel
 Diane Ayala Goldner – Cashier
 Peter Mark Richman – Paul Marcus
 Richard Herd – Richard Hanson
 Sage Stallone – Doc
 Robert Jayne -  Vic's driver
 Robert F. Lyons - Skip Hurtado

Production
The film was shot on location in Los Angeles, California. Cinematographer John Gulager, best known for being a participant in Project Greenlight and the director of the Feast films, used a 35mm Panavision camera and lenses shooting in the 1.85:1 aspect ratio. The 35 mm film was processed at Technicolor lab in Hollywood. The film's score was composed by Franco Micalizzi, famous for some of Italian cinema's most memorable scores of the 1970s and 1980s.

References

External links

Sage Stallone info about Vic

2006 films
American drama short films
2006 short films
Films about actors
Films set in Los Angeles
2006 directorial debut films
2006 drama films
2000s English-language films
2000s American films